Come In from the Rain may refer to:

 "Come In from the Rain", a song written in 1975 by Melissa Manchester and Carole Bayer Sager, covered by many artists
 Come In from the Rain (Andi Deris album), 1997
 Come In from the Rain (Captain & Tennille album), 1977